The Ussuriysk constituency (No. 53) was a Russian legislative constituency in Primorsky Krai in 1993-2007. The constituency covered several major cities in southern Primorsky Krai; it stretched from Khasan near the border with North Korea to Ussuriysk, 98 kilometres north of Vladivostok, and then south-east to the port of Nakhodka. In 2016 the territory of the former Ussuriysk constituency was divided: south-western Primorsky Krai and Ussuriysk were placed into Vladivostok constituency, Bolshoy Kamen and Fokino into Artyom constituency, and Nakhodka and Partizansk were put into Arsenyev constituency.

Members elected

Election results

1993

|-
! colspan=2 style="background-color:#E9E9E9;text-align:left;vertical-align:top;" |Candidate
! style="background-color:#E9E9E9;text-align:left;vertical-align:top;" |Party
! style="background-color:#E9E9E9;text-align:right;" |Votes
! style="background-color:#E9E9E9;text-align:right;" |%
|-
|style="background-color:"|
|align=left|Igor Ustinov
|align=left|Independent
|
|29.48%
|-
|style="background-color:"|
|align=left|Aleksandr Kostenko
|align=left|Independent
| -
|16.30%
|-
| colspan="5" style="background-color:#E9E9E9;"|
|- style="font-weight:bold"
| colspan="3" style="text-align:left;" | Total
| 
| 100%
|-
| colspan="5" style="background-color:#E9E9E9;"|
|- style="font-weight:bold"
| colspan="4" |Source:
|
|}

1995

|-
! colspan=2 style="background-color:#E9E9E9;text-align:left;vertical-align:top;" |Candidate
! style="background-color:#E9E9E9;text-align:left;vertical-align:top;" |Party
! style="background-color:#E9E9E9;text-align:right;" |Votes
! style="background-color:#E9E9E9;text-align:right;" |%
|-
|style="background-color:"|
|align=left|Svetlana Goryacheva
|align=left|Communist Party
|
|43.64%
|-
|style="background-color:"|
|align=left|Aleksandr Kostenko
|align=left|Independent
|
|8.60%
|-
|style="background-color:"|
|align=left|Yury Malyshev
|align=left|Our Home – Russia
|
|8.38%
|-
|style="background-color:"|
|align=left|Oleg Mitusov
|align=left|Liberal Democratic Party
|
|5.56%
|-
|style="background-color:"|
|align=left|Anatoly Chernovol
|align=left|Political Movement of Transport Workers
|
|4.13%
|-
|style="background-color:"|
|align=left|Natalya Makarova
|align=left|Independent
|
|3.43%
|-
|style="background-color:#265BAB"|
|align=left|Yury Orlenko
|align=left|Russian Lawyers' Association
|
|3.18%
|-
|style="background-color:"|
|align=left|Igor Lebedinets
|align=left|Independent
|
|2.75%
|-
|style="background-color:"|
|align=left|Aleksandr Rusanov
|align=left|Independent
|
|2.71%
|-
|style="background-color:"|
|align=left|Nina Roshchina
|align=left|Agrarian Party
|
|2.42%
|-
|style="background-color:"|
|align=left|Karl Isakovich
|align=left|Independent
|
|1.12%
|-
|style="background-color:"|
|align=left|Vladimir Kruglikov
|align=left|Independent
|
|0.87%
|-
|style="background-color:#000000"|
|colspan=2 |against all
|
|11.37%
|-
| colspan="5" style="background-color:#E9E9E9;"|
|- style="font-weight:bold"
| colspan="3" style="text-align:left;" | Total
| 
| 100%
|-
| colspan="5" style="background-color:#E9E9E9;"|
|- style="font-weight:bold"
| colspan="4" |Source:
|
|}

1999

|-
! colspan=2 style="background-color:#E9E9E9;text-align:left;vertical-align:top;" |Candidate
! style="background-color:#E9E9E9;text-align:left;vertical-align:top;" |Party
! style="background-color:#E9E9E9;text-align:right;" |Votes
! style="background-color:#E9E9E9;text-align:right;" |%
|-
|style="background-color:"|
|align=left|Svetlana Goryacheva (incumbent)
|align=left|Communist Party
|
|49.87%
|-
|style="background-color:"|
|align=left|Valery Yashin
|align=left|Unity
|
|14.16%
|-
|style="background-color:"|
|align=left|Mikhail Pilipenko
|align=left|Independent
|
|8.55%
|-
|style="background-color:"|
|align=left|Aleksandr Plotnikov
|align=left|Independent
|
|3.75%
|-
|style="background-color:"|
|align=left|Valery Rozov
|align=left|Independent
|
|3.12%
|-
|style="background-color:#084284"|
|align=left|Aleksandr Klimenok
|align=left|Spiritual Heritage
|
|3.03%
|-
|style="background-color:"|
|align=left|Vyacheslav Oleynik
|align=left|Independent
|
|2.09%
|-
|style="background-color:#000000"|
|colspan=2 |against all
|
|13.23%
|-
| colspan="5" style="background-color:#E9E9E9;"|
|- style="font-weight:bold"
| colspan="3" style="text-align:left;" | Total
| 
| 100%
|-
| colspan="5" style="background-color:#E9E9E9;"|
|- style="font-weight:bold"
| colspan="4" |Source:
|
|}

2003

|-
! colspan=2 style="background-color:#E9E9E9;text-align:left;vertical-align:top;" |Candidate
! style="background-color:#E9E9E9;text-align:left;vertical-align:top;" |Party
! style="background-color:#E9E9E9;text-align:right;" |Votes
! style="background-color:#E9E9E9;text-align:right;" |%
|-
|style="background-color:"|
|align=left|Svetlana Goryacheva (incumbent)
|align=left|Independent
|
|40.99%
|-
|style="background-color:"|
|align=left|Viktor Krivulin
|align=left|Independent
|
|16.72%
|-
|style="background-color:"|
|align=left|Nurmet Aliyev
|align=left|Independent
|
|6.36%
|-
|style="background-color:"|
|align=left|Yury Kuznetsov
|align=left|Agrarian Party
|
|5.51%
|-
|style="background-color:"|
|align=left|Vyacheslav Alekseyev
|align=left|Liberal Democratic Party
|
|4.95%
|-
|style="background-color:#1042A5"|
|align=left|Nikolay Morozov
|align=left|Union of Right Forces
|
|3.40%
|-
|style="background-color:"|
|align=left|Aleksey Samodelok
|align=left|Independent
|
|0.94%
|-
|style="background-color:#164C8C"|
|align=left|Sergey Fokin
|align=left|United Russian Party Rus'
|
|0.93%
|-
|style="background-color:#000000"|
|colspan=2 |against all
|
|18.11%
|-
| colspan="5" style="background-color:#E9E9E9;"|
|- style="font-weight:bold"
| colspan="3" style="text-align:left;" | Total
| 
| 100%
|-
| colspan="5" style="background-color:#E9E9E9;"|
|- style="font-weight:bold"
| colspan="4" |Source:
|
|}

Notes

References

Obsolete Russian legislative constituencies
Politics of Primorsky Krai